DNA damage-binding protein 1 is a protein that in humans is encoded by the DDB1 gene.

Gene
The gene's position is on chromosome 11q12-q13.

Protein
The DDB1 gene encodes the large subunit of DNA damage-binding protein, a heterodimer composed of a large and a small (DDB2) subunit. DDB1 contains 1140 amino acids, amounting to a mass of 127 kDa.

Function
As its name suggests, DDB1 was initially implicated in the process of a specific type of DNA repair known as nucleotide excision repair. Since then, researchers have found that DDB1 primarily functions as a core component of the CUL4A- and CUL4B-based E3 ubiquitin ligase complexes. DDB1 serves as a bridge or adaptor protein which interacts with dozens of proteins known as DDB1 and CUL4-associated factors (DCAFs). These DCAFs are often ubiquitin ligase substrates and regulate numerous essential processes in the cell including DNA repair (DDB2), DNA replication, chromatin remodeling (Cdt2) and more.

Interactions 
DDB1 has been shown to interact with Transcription initiation protein SPT3 homolog, GCN5L2, DDB2, CUL4A, CUL4B and P21.

References

Further reading